Coalla is a town in the Coalla Department of Gnagna Province in eastern Burkina Faso. The town has a population of 1,092 and is the capital of Coalla Department.

References

External links
Satellite map at Maplandia.com

Populated places in the Est Region (Burkina Faso)
Gnagna Province